The LXXIV Army Corps was an army corps of the German Wehrmacht during World War II.

History 
The LXXIV Army Corps was formed on 26 July 1943 as a static army corps under the authority of Oberbefehlshaber West (Army Group D) in Hanover in Wehrkreis XI. It was subordinate to the 7th Army from July 1943 to June 1944 and subsequently joined, at times, the 5th Panzer Army and the 15th Army. The initial commander of the LXXIV Army Corps was Erich Straube.

On 16 December 1944, Straube was succeeded as corps commander by Carl Püchler.

The LXXIV Army Corps was trapped in the Ruhr Pocket at the end of the war.

Structure

Noteworthy individuals 

 Erich Straube, corps commander of LXXIV Army Corps (1 August 1943 – 16 December 1944).
 Carl Püchler, corps commander of LXXIV Army Corps (16 December 1944 – April 1945).

References 

Corps of Germany in World War II
Military units and formations established in 1943
Military units and formations disestablished in 1945